al-Jamel, alternatively spelled Shamil, is a village in northern Aleppo Governorate, northern Syria.

With 2,091 inhabitants, as per the 2004 census, al-Jamel administratively belongs to Nahiya Jarabulus within Jarabulus District. Nearby localities include Marma al-Hajar  to the northwest, and Amarnah  to the south.

References

Populated places on the Euphrates River